Bensiyon Morisbhai Songavkar is an Indian professional cricketer who has represented Saurashtra. He lives in Rajkot, India, and is Jewish.

Playing career 
In 2008, Songavkar was included in a special Israel squad that played against India in a special match in honour of Israel's 60th anniversary. Songavkar was a suggested inclusion by then BCCI secretary general, Niranjan Shah, after the Israel Cricket Association requested names of Jewish cricketers in India.

A year later, Songavkar played for Team India which won a silver medal as he was selected player of the tournament for cricket at the 2009 Maccabiah Games in Israel. He was Captain of Team India in cricket at the 2017 Maccabiah Games.

See also
List of select Jewish cricketers

Footnotes 

Living people
Jewish Indian sportspeople
Jewish cricketers
Indian cricketers
Saurashtra cricketers
Maccabiah Games competitors for India
Maccabiah Games medalists in cricket
Maccabiah Games silver medalists for India
Competitors at the 2009 Maccabiah Games
Competitors at the 2017 Maccabiah Games
1985 births
Bene Israel